Frank Alvord Perret (2 August 1867 in Hartford, Connecticut – January 12, 1943 in New York City) was an American entrepreneur, inventor, and volcanologist, who was particularly well known for his studies of eruptions of Vesuvius, Kilauea and Mount Pelée.

Career as an Engineer
He studied physics at Polytechnic Institute of New York University and was then employed in the laboratories of Thomas Edison in the Lower East Side, where he worked on the development of engines and dynamos. In 1886, he founded the Elektron Manufacturing Company, together with John A. Barrett, a small company that designed and produced electronic devices. Frank A. Perret became involved in the development of the theory of EMF (s:.Counter-electromotive force, CEMF), and invented the Perret electric motor. In 1889, Perret appointed Elihu H. Cutler to oversee the expansion of the company, and with it a new factory in Springfield in Massachusetts. Among other things, Perret's company built elevators, and was later acquired in 1906 by the Otis Elevator Company. In 1902, Perret fell ill having suffered 'nervous prostration caused by overwork'. In 1903, Perret went to Italy to recuperate, and it was there in Naples, that he had his first encounter with Vesuvius. He soon made the acquaintance of the Director of the Vesuvius Volcano Observatory, Prof. Raffaele V. Matteucci, and by 1906 had become Prof. Matteucci's honorary assistant at the Observatory.

Contributions to Volcanology

During April 1906, Perret and Matteucci observed a major eruption of Vesuvius, during which Perret took numerous photographs and made many observations of eruptive phenomena, including St Elmo's Fire. Perret eventually published a major monograph on this eruption in 1924. In her obituary of Perret, Mildred Giblin wrote that Perret's monograph on the Vesuvius was "the clearest and most comprehensive report ever on a volcanic eruption and its aftermath published". By the end of the first decade of the 20th century Perret had also visited the volcanoes of Kilauea, Stromboli, Etna, Mount Teide and Sakurajima. In 1909 Perret suggested to the geophysicists Thomas Jaggar from Massachusetts Institute of Technology and Reginald A. Daly of Harvard University to establish a continuous monitoring station at Kilauea. Perret spent four months on Kilauea in 1911, where he  began to make the first long-term observations of activity from the edge of the crater Halemaʻumaʻu. The station was the forerunner of the Hawaiian Volcano Observatory, which was built by Thomas Jaggar the following year. When Mount Pelée on the French Caribbean island of Martinique became active again in 1929, some years after the devastating eruption of 1902 Perret was one of the first scientists on site. During the three years of volcanic activity, from 1929-1932, he conducted numerous investigations and in 1931 he built a small observation hut on the Morne Lenard above the valley of the Riviere Blanch as the first permanent station on the mountain. Perret published a monograph on the Pelee eruptions in 1936. During his extended stay on Martinique, Perret raised funds to establish a volcanological museum in St Pierre, to 'tell the story of the Modern Pompeii'. The founders of this enterprise included a local rum merchant, Victor Depaz, and philanthropists Vincent Astor, William L Mellon and George F Baker.  The Musée Franck A. Perret volcanological museum opened in 1933, and re-opened in 2019 after renovations as the Frank Perret Museum - Memorial to the 1902 Catastrophe.

Publications (selection)
The lava fountains of Kilauea inAmerican Journal of Science, No. 4, 1913, Pages 139-148
The circulatory system in the Halemaumau lava lake during the summer of 1911in American Journal of Science, No. 4, 1913, Pages 337-349
Volcanic research at Kilauea in the summer of 1911in American Journal of Science, No. 4, 1913, Pages 475-488
The Eruption of Mount Pelee 1929 - 1932. Carnegie Institution of Washington, Publication 458, Washington DC, 1935
What to expect of a volcano in Natural History, No. 2, 1937, Pages 99–105
Obituary by Mildred Giblin)Bulletin of Volcanology, 1950, Pages 191-195
Volcanological Observations, Carnegie Institution of Washington, Publication 549, Washington DC, 1950

Sources

American volcanologists
19th-century American inventors
20th-century American inventors
1867 births
1943 deaths